The Cedar Cultural Center ("the Cedar") is a music venue in Cedar-Riverside neighborhood of Minneapolis, Minnesota, United States near the West Bank campus of the University of Minnesota. It is a 503(c) non-profit organization and operated by volunteers.

History 
The building which houses the Cedar Cultural Center was a movie theater called the Cedar Theater from 1948 until the 1970s. In 1989 the building was donated to the non-profit organization Minnesota STAR (Society for Traditional Arts and Resources) started by Deb Martin and Mary Ann Dotson.

Events 
The Cedar is the host to a wide variety of musical genres with an emphasis on world music and lesser known or independent artists. Since 2009, the Cedar has hosted an annual Global Roots Festival showcasing international musicians.

See also 

 West Bank campus of University of Minnesota
 Not-for-profit arts organization

References

External links

Music venues in Minnesota